Landsskytterstevnet it is the Norwegian national rifle championship for all the disciplines within Det frivillige Skyttervesen, and is one of Norway's largest annual sporting events. Men and women of all ages contend for the title as either "Shooting King" or "Shooting Queen" (class 3-5), and "Shooting Prince" or "Shooting Princess" (class 1-2).

References 

Rifle shooting sports
Shooting competitions in Norway